Saanjher Baati ( Evening Light) is an 2019 Indian Bengali Romantic Drama Thriller television series that premiered on 1 July 2019 on Star Jalsha and it's also available on digital platform Disney+ Hotstar before it's telecast. The show is produced by Acropoliis Entertainment Pvt. Ltd. The show aired its last episode on 12 December 2021, leaving the story incomplete. It stars Debchandrima Singha Roy and Rezwan Rabbani Sheikh.

Synopsis
Saanjher Baati showcases a sweet and beautiful love story filled with emotions, conflicts, and heartwarming moments. The show traces the lives of Charu and Arjoman and their journey of rising above norms that define relationships. At the core of the story is the relationship between the protagonists and how they both go to lengths to fulfill each other's dreams and complement each other in pursuing their passion. Initially the story focused on the love story of Charu, a simple village girl and a sweet maker, and Arjo, a blind businessman. However, they met their tragic death due to Surjasekhar and Mishmi and their souls get reincarnated into Chitrangada, a rich girl and a photographer, and Arjun, a mechanic, and the story focused on love story of Arjun and Chitrangada.

Plot
Charu, a simple attractive village girl and a dedicated sweet maker of village Madhabpur (which is famous for sweets), becomes an object of envy for her stepmother, Jhumpa, and stepsister Chumki. With kindness and courage as her biggest strengths, she endures all hardships inflicted by them with a smile. Charu harbors a dream to fulfill her passion for making sweets. She yearns to open her sweet shop but due to circumstances, fails to do so. Fate intervenes when she marries Arjoman (a blind man), son of North Kolkata's Mullick family, the well-known sweet-makers of the city, and begins a love story like no other.

After Arjo and Charu's marriage, Jhumpa, Chumki, and Sohini start plotting to separate them, but they stay united after overcoming millions of obstacles. However, one day, Arjo encounters a terrible accident after he is pushed from the stairs and he went into a coma. Charu is framed and thus, Mollika throws her out of the house. Charu decides to donate her eyes to Arjo to regain his consciousness, and so she fakes her death due to a terrible accident. Dejected by Charu's demise, the Mullicks, according to Sohini's request, introduces Mishmi as Charu to Arjo, after he regains his sight, to hide the truth. After regaining consciousness, Charu refuses to return to the Mullicks and continues to stay with Dr. Banerjee and his sister Amrita (Angshu's love interest), and his daughter Chini (actually it was Angshu and Amrita's daughter). One day, Arjo meets real Charu, unaware that it is his wife, and Charu too hides her identity and adopts a new name, Chandrima. Charu joins a blind school and Arjo cooperates with her. Meanwhile, Arjo and Charu come closer, which makes Mishmi realize that Chandrima is the real Charu and so she decides to kill her, with the help of her father Surjasekhar, who was Mullick's closest enemy and a named criminal. Arjo later identifies Charu and joins Charu's plan. Mishmi and Surjasekhar plots to destroy the Mulicks and Charu along with Amrita disguise themselves to ruin their plan. They kill Charu's father and attempted to kill Charu, but she is rescued by Arjo and thus after her brain surgery, she regains eyesight. Sohini and her son Ronit, who was also involved in Surjasekhar's plan, reform their ways. The Mullicks unitedly expose Surjasekhar and Mishmi to the police. However, Surjasekhar escapes from the jail, and Mishmi is released due to Ronit's request. Chumki divorces Angshu and he marries Amrita and adopts Chini. Mishmi starts plotting against Charu and Arjo and she bribes the doctor and proves to Arjo that he cannot become a father. This leads Arjo to misunderstand Charu's pregnancy, and so Charu leaves the house again. Arjo reforms his ways and brings her back after his requests.

Mishmi misleads Charu's mother, Sheuli, who was alive, to kill Charu, and adds poison to the sweets in her factory and frames Arjo for the same. After this Surjasekhar kidnaps Chini, Arjo spots him and while trying to escape, he fakes his death in an accident. Later, Sheuli identifies Charu and confesses her crimes. Meanwhile, Surjasekhar returns to kill Charu and he throws a bomb inside Charu's car, which blasts, causing her death. Devastated and agitated, Arjo shoots Surjasekhar and thus gets arrested. Meanwhile, Jhumpa hits Charu, who actually had survived the blast and was lying half-dead on the ground, and snatches her jewellery. Mishmi, her brother Mohit, and Jhumpa plan to impersonate Mishmi's daughter as Charu's daughter to the Mullicks. Arjo mourns and laments Charu's death and decides to kill Mishmi and Mohit, after he gets released. On the other hand, Charu is rescued by a stranger named Deepjoy.

After 18 years
Arjo is released from jail after serving 14 years and now he lives with a dual identity, as a photographer and a secret agent, Captain Azad. Charu loses her memory and now she adopts a new name, Anushree, and lives happily with Deepjoy and her blind daughter, Bhumi. Also on the other hand, the Mullicks raise Srimon, unaware that it is Mishmi and Ronit's daughter. At North-Bengal, Arjo arrives for a secret mission and he meets Bhumi on the way, unaware that it is his daughter. Bhumi, after meeting him, wishes to pursue photography and become a famous photographer just like him, but she is unaware that he is her biological father. At the past, it is shown that Deepjoy admitted Charu to the hospital,  where he requests doctor to save both, mother and baby, unaware of Charu's identity. Then Charu gave birth to a baby girl and names her Bhumi.

Bhumi arrives at Kolkata along with Arjo to study at its prestigious college, which makes Srimon jealous. However one day, he meets Charu but later gets a shock when he learns that Charu is Anushree, Deepjoy's wife and Charu's lookalike. Also the Mullick family is shocked to see Anushree resembling completely as Charu and they decides to testify her and so, they befriends Anushree and Bhumi. Meanwhile, Arjo learns about their new threat in their city, a terrorist operation conducted by a woman named 'Bari Amma' and Deepjoy was also a major part in that operation. Deepjoy uses Anushree (aka Charu) as his trump card to conduct the operations.

Arjo leaves Kolkata for some days for his mission and he allows Anushree and Bhumi to stay at his house. During their stay, Anushree's actions starts reminding her of Charu, suddenly. Also, Bhumi and Srimon meets their new instructor named Ayush, with whom she falls in love, but he likes Bhumi and rejects Srimon. Meanwhile, Deepjoy falls for Anushree and decides to give up his evil ways, much against Bari Amma and Mohit's will. At the past, it is shown that Deepjoy was instructed by Bari Amma and Mohit to pose as Charu's husband and Bhumi's father, since she is suffering from amnesia.

After returning to Kolkata, Arjo starts his mission to catch the terrorists and Bari Amma uses Anushree to conduct her operation. But suddenly, Anushree and Arjo come closer accidentally. And they goes hiding at Charu's hut in Madhabpur, after Arjo gets shot by Deepjoy. After some days, Anushree regains her memories and realises that she is the real Charu, and thus, reconciles with Arjo. Also Arjo learns that Bhumi is his daughter. Also Deepjoy learns from Bari Amma that Anushree is Charu Mallick. Furious, Deepjoy question Bari Amma about the reason behind hiding her identity,  to which she replies that she wanted to exact revenge from the Mullick family. Further, he is instructed by Bari Amma to instigate Bhumi against Arjo.

Also, Bari Amma reveals to Mohit that Surjasekhar is alive and brings him back. Later Surjasekhar reveals to Ayesha (aka Bari Amma) that Deepjoy is actually Mollika's eldest son who was separated from her by Surjasekhar, since birth as he replaced Mollika's baby with a dead one and handed him over to Bari Amma. Surjasekhar instigates Deepjoy against the Mullicks and instructs him to kill Swami Radhemohan, who was actually Sohini's husband and Ronit's father. Bhumi requests Arjo to stay away from her mother. Also Bhumi and Charu return to the Mullick mansion and the family goes for a trip as per Bhumi's request, as a part of a plan by Deepjoy. Deepjoy tries to kill Arjo, but is shocked when Surjasekhar proves him that Anushree had regained her memories. Further, Surjasekhar confesses the truth to Deepjoy that he is Mollika's eldest son, but weaves a false story and instigates him against Mollika.

Arjo and Charu escapes, but suddenly Mishmi arrives in disguise and pretends to help them, as part of her plan. Charu reveals to Bhumi that Arjo is her father, which shocks the latter, and Arjo also reveals to the family that Anushree is actually Charu. Arjo and Charu enters Deepjoy's lair and searches for proofs, but is shocked to see that all illegal documents contains Charu's signature. On the other hand, Surjasekhar reveals Deepjoy's truth to Mollika and the latter threatens to harm Arjo. Also Deepjoy's henchmen tries to kill Swami Radhemohan, but is saved by Charu and Chumki. In a bid to save Arjo's life, Mollika agrees to Surjasekhar's conditions. Arjo and Charu confronts Dipjoy for his intentions, to which the latter replies that Mollika is responsible for Deepjoy's transformation to a terrorist. Arjo requests Deepjoy not to do anything wrong. At home, Chumki curses Jhumpa and decides to throw her out of the house, but the family stops her. Next day, Arjo and Charu prepares for Bhumi and Srimon's eighteenth birthday. But suddenly Arjo falls prey to Mishmi's trap and he is taken hostage by her. Deepjoy has a change of heart after Swami Radhemohan(Ronit's father) reveals the truth about him. Surjasekhar disguises himself as Arjo and enters the mansion. At the evening, they take the family as hostage. Deepjoy, on the other hand, rescues Arjo, but suddenly is shot by Bari Amma and Deepjoy also shoots her in return. Then he drops Arjo to his house. But suddenly an explosion kills the family trapped inside the ablazed room and at the next instant, Surjasekhar shoots Charu. Meanwhile, Arjo reaches the spot and tries to rescue Charu, but is shot by Mishmi, as he attempts to shoot Surjasekhar. Dejected by seeing Arjo and Charu's corpse laid beside each other, a heartbroken Mollika curses Surjasekhar and tells him that Charu and Arjo will return again and they will severely punish them for their crimes.

After 25 years
Mollika and Sohini are the only survivors of the war waged by Surjasekhar and Mishmi, where Arjo, Charu and the rest of the family met a tragic death. Mollika spent her all of the time at a temple praying for Arjo and Charu's reincarnation in order to punish Surjasekhar,  and at last, her wishes came true. Charu is reborn as Chitrangada Dostidaar aka Chiku, daughter of a famous NRI businessman Niloy Dostidaar, whereas Arjo is reborn as Arjun, a mechanic.

Mishmi plans to sell the Mullick's mansion to Niloy thus defying Surjasekhar. Also Mollika observes Arjun at a temple and assumes him to be Arjo. Sohini tries to convince her that Arjo is no more, but Mollika refuses to believe it. Mishmi receives a cheque of INR 30 lakhs, but however, Amrita's spirit tears it off. Also Chiku brings her car to Arjun's garage and the two engage in a fight with each other. Chiku enters the Mullick mansion, but however is shocked when Amrita's spirit calls her by the name Charu. At midnight, Amrita's spirit decorates the house since she is elated by Charu's return.

Chiku decides to avenge Arjun for his behaviour towards her, and thus, she ends up being the client for his vintage car. Initially Arjun refuses her job, but later when his family faces shortage of money, he accepts it. Also, Chiku shares a sweet relationship with Arjun's family from the first day she arrived at Arjun's house. But however, her father and aunt objects this, as his family belongs to a lower-middle-class family. Meanwhile, Chiku starts having an interest for Arjun, but Arjun decides to avoid her, since she belongs to a higher class. One day, her father finalises her wedding with Garry, an NRI boy, who was her aunt's brother's son. Chiku rejects Garry, as he is foolish, ugly and overspoken, and recommends an honest man as her husband. But however, her cunning aunt, Kaushambhi weaves an evil plan to bring Garry and Chiku closer. She lies to Arjun and invites her for dinner, while she herself goes out along with family and Garry for dinner, leaving Chiku alone. Then she frames Chiku for having an affair with Arjun and as a result, Niloy, hastily arranges Chiku's marriage with Garry. But however, with the help of Amrita's spirit, she escapes from the house and arrives at Arjun's garage.

At garage, Chiku requests Arjun to marry her and fake their marriage in order to save herself from her forced marriage with Garry. Initially Arjun refuses, but after she threatens to end her life, he agrees. Also, it was the night when Charu and Arjo were married, and to her surprise, Mollika meets Arjun and Chitrangada for the first time at the temple. Chiku and Arjun ties the knot and they get married, which angers Niloy and he disowns Chiku at that instant. Arjun tries to console a dejected Chiku, but she replies that her father will never return. Chiku receives a warm welcome from Arjun's family, as she enters his house. On the other hand, an enraged Niloy decides to cut Chiku's ties with rest of the family. Kaushambhi takes advantage of this and plans a conspiracy against him.

Chiku takes a stand for Arjun when the neighbours insult him for marrying a rich girl. Prajukta, Poulomi, and Leo goes out to meet Chiku but Niloy, Kaushambhi and Garry catches them and forcefully takes them to their house whereas Chiku tries to meet them but failed. Kaushambhi gets to know Niloy's hidden feelings from him but Kaushambhi tries to instigate him against Chicku, Arjun and rest of the Roy family. One day, Arjun's father invites the Dostidars to attend Chiku's and Arjun's reception but instead Niloy insults them and asks them to leave the house. On the other hand, Chiku warns Arjun about Niloy not accepting him as his son-in-law. Slowly, Chicku realises that she has started falling in love with Arjun before leaving his house in order to return to the Dostidars.

After a couple of days, the police visits the Roys and arrests Kaustab because of Niloy falsely charging him for the money which was stolen from his bank account. Chiku and Arjun decides to save Kaustab by proving him innocent. After all the circumstances, Nupur and her mother blames Chiku. Meanwhile, Prajukta visits the Roys. But after all the insults, Chiku leaves the house along with her mother, leaving Arjun and rest of the Roy family heartbroken. After coming back to her house, Chiku realises that it was Kaushambhi and Garry's plan to conspire against Kaustab. She decides to punish them by exposing their deeds to the rest of the family. One day, after proving Kaustab innocent and after his marriage, Chiku gets a shock seeing her and Arjun's old photographs together in other attire. She decides to confront Mollika about the same. Mollika and Sohini reveals her story and also about Surjasekhar and Mishmi's evil deeds. Hearing all these, the duo decides to help them get justice. They shelter them into her house, recovers the property papers and returns it to them. Also during Durga Puja, the couple stages a drama in order to prove Surjasekhar and Mishmi guilty. But however, Arjo and Charu's spirit appears in front of them and kills them. Overwhelmed by Chiku and Arjun's loyalty and honesty, Mallika renames her property in Arjun and Chiku's name. And also requests them to donate the Mullick mansion to Charu's blind school.

5 years later
Arjun, Chiku and the family moves to a new house. But however Garry and Kaushambhi execute her evil plan and gets Chiku arrested on the charge of stealing money. Also they try to kill Niloy, but Chiku escapes the police and saves him. A remorseful Niloy proves Garry guilty for his fraud case, and also apologizes to Arjun and his family for his evil deeds. Garry escapes the country upon Kaushambhi's instruction. Then suddenly Yuvraj Mukherjee, another friend of Chiku, returns to India and meets Chiku in order to break her relationship with Arjun, upon Kaushambhi's plan. Also Yuvi had sheltered Chiku's estranged sister, Aradhya, into his house. Chiku meets Aradhya, who was suffering from cancer, and her son, Gogol, and she gets to know about her story, that her lover left her, since her father disowns her, since he was poor. Chiku also discovers that Kaustab is her lover and that Yuvi had been posing as Gogol's father. Upon learning about Aradhya's illness, Chiku decides to get her custody, but Yuvi tactfully makes her his wife and Gogol's real mother. Also Kaushambhi poisons Arjun's mind against Chiku.

On Chiku and Arjun's marriage day, Arjun gets the biggest shock by learning that Chiku is Gogol's mother and Yuvi is her husband. Angered, he decides to break the marriage. Also on the other hand, Chiku, who was disturbed by Aradhya's death (although she was alive as per Kaushambhi's plan), decides to call off the wedding. Upon returning home, Arjun accuses her of cheating him and his family, which angers Chiku and she confesses all her lies. She also decides to break the marriage and leave the house, and also promises to wait for him until he realizes his mistake. The story ends with Arjun and Chiku getting emotional after getting separated from each other.

Cast

Main 
 Debachandrima Singha Roy as 
 Charu Ghosh Mallick – Shenuli and Bhanu's daughter; Jhumpa's step-daughter; Chumki's step-sister; Arjo's wife; Bhoomi's mother. (2019-2021) (Dead)
 Chitrangada "Chiku" Dostidaar Roy – Reborn Charu; A rich photographer; Niloy and Prajukta's younger daughter; Aradhya's sister; Poulomi and Leo's cousin; Arjun's wife. (2021)
 Rezwan Rabbani Sheikh as 
 Arjoman "Arjo" Mallick – A blind businessman and photographer; Mallika and Arun's second son; Deepjoy, Angshu and Mouli's brother; Ronit and Bony's cousin; Charu's husband; Bhoomi's father. (2019-2021) (Dead)
 Arjun Roy – Reborn Arjo; A mechanic and automobile engineer; Sunanda and Biplab's younger son; Labanya and Kaustab's brother; Tupur's cousin; Chiku's husband. (2021)

Recurring 
 Soumodip Singha Roy as Angshuman "Angshu" Mallick – Mallika and Arun's youngest son; Deepjoy, Arjo and Mouli's brother; Ronit and Bony's cousin brother; Chumki's ex-husband; Amrita's husband; Chini's father (2019-2021) (Dead)
 Ritisha Ganguly / Piyali Sasmal as Amrita Banerjee Mallick – Dr. Banerjee's sister; Angshu's wife; Chini's mother (2019-2021) (Dead)
 Dipanwita Rakshit as Chumki Ghosh Mukherjee – Jhumpa and Madan's daughter; Bhanu's step-daughter; Charu's step-sister; Angshu's ex-wife; Anubhav's wife (2019-2021)
 Rahul Dev Bose as Anubhav Mukherjee – A bank manager; Chumki's second husband (2021)
 Kanchana Moitra as Jhumpa Ghosh – Madan's ex-wife; Bhanu's wife; Chumki's mother; Charu's step-mother (2019-2021)
 Ratan Sarkhel as Bhanu Ghosh – Shenuli's widower; Jhumpa's husband; Charu's father; Chumki's step-father (2019-2020)
 Minakshi Ghosh as Sheuli Ghosh – Bhanu's first wife; Charu's mother (2021) (Dead)
 Shaktipada Dey as Madan – Jhumpa's ex-husband; Chumki's father. (2020)
 June Malia as Mallika Mallick – Arun's wife; Deepjoy, Arjo, Angshu and Mouli's mother; Bhoomi, Chini and Srimon's grandmother; Srimon's adoptive grandmother. (2019-2021)
 Anirban Guha as Arun Mallick – Anuradha and Daduvai's elder son; Sohini and Binoy's brother; Mallika's husband; Deepjoy, Arjo, Angshu and Mouli's father; Bhoomi, Chini and Srimon's grandfather; Srimon's adoptive grandfather. (2019-2020) (Dead)
 Priyanka Chakraborty as Mouli Mallick – Mallika and Arun's daughter; Deepjoy, Arjo and Angshu's sister; Ronit and Bony's cousin (2019-2020)
 Indrajit Mazumdar as Deepjoy Mallick – Former terrorist businessman; Mallika and Arun's eldest son; Arjo, Angshu and Mouli's brother. (2021) (Dead)
 Sawan Dey as Bani Mallick – Binoy's wife; Bony's mother (2019-2021)
 Avijit Sengupta as Binoy Mallick – Anuradha and Daduvai's younger son; Arun and Sohini's brother; Bani's husband; Bony's father (2019-2021)
 Swarnava Sanyal as Bony Mallick – Bani and Binoy's son; Deepjoy, Arjo, Angshu, Mouli and Ronit's cousin (2019-2020)
 Anuradha Roy as Anuradha Mallik – Daduvai's wife; Arun, Sohini and Binoy's mother; Deepjoy, Arjo, Angshu, Mouli, Ronit and Bony's grandmother (2019-2021)
 Unknown as Daduvai – Anuradha's husband; Arun, Sohini and Binoy's father; Deepjoy, Arjo, Angshu, Mouli, Ronit and Bony's grandfather. (2019-2020)
 Sohini Sanyal as Sohini Mallick Sengupta – Anuradha and Daduvai's daughter; Arun and Binoy's sister; Shramik's wife; Ronit's mother; Srimon's grandmother. (2019-2021)
 Anindya Banerjee as Ronit Sengupta – Sohini and Shramik's son; Deepjoy, Arjo, Angshu, Mouli and Bony's cousin; Mishmi's husband; Srimon's father (2020-2021)
 Priya Mondal as Mishmi Das Sengupta – Surjoshekar and Tanuja's daughter; Mohit's sister; Arjo's fraud wife; Ronit's wife; Srimon's mother; Arjo's murderer. (2020-2021) (Dead)
 Priyantika Karmakar as Bhoomi Mallick – Charu and Arjo's daughter; Srimon's cousin; Ayush's love interest. (2021)
 Shirsha Guha Thakurta as Srimon Sengupta – Ronit and Mishmi's daughter; Bhoomi's cousin; Ayush's former love interest. (2021)
 Debraj Mukherjee as Surjoshekhar Das – A terrorist; Tanuja's husband; Mishmi and Mohit's father; Srimon's grandfather; Charu's murderer. (2020-2021) (Dead)
 Poushmita Goswami as Tanuja Das – Surjoshekar's wife; Mishmi and Mohit's mother; Srimon's grandmother. (2020)
 Priyam as Mohit Das – Surjoshekhar and Tanuja's son; Mishmi's brother. (2021)
 Gora Dhar as Mr. Kundu – Mallick's sweet manager (2019-2020)
 Nilankur Mukhopadhyay as Dr. Banerjee – Amrita's brother (2020)
 Sreetoma Roy Chowdhury as Raima – Charu's competer and friend in Asian food competition (2020)
 Sayantani Sengupta as Ayesha aka Bari Amma – Leader of the terrorist group. (2021)
 Omkar Bhattacharyya as Ayush – Bhoomi and Srimon's instructor; Bhoomi's love interest. (2021)
 Himanshu De as Alok – An investigation officer; Arjo's boss who appointed him as captain Azad (2021)
 Kaushik Chakraborty as Niloy Dostidaar – A famous NRI businessman; Bonolata's elder son; Proloy's brother; Prajukta's husband; Aradhya and Chiku's father; Gogol's grandfather. (2021)
 Sanjuktaa Roy Chowdhury as Prajukta Dostidaar – Niloy's wife; Aradhya and Chiku's mother; Gogol's grandmother. (2021)
 Sanghita Ghosh as Aradhya Dostidar – Niloy and Prajukta's elder daughter; Chiku's sister; Poulomi and Leo's cousin; Kaustab's former lover; Gogol's mother. (2021)
 Samir Biswas as Mr. Dostidaar – Bonolata's husband; Niloy and Proloy's father; Aradhya, Chiku, Poulomi and Leo's grandfather. (2021)
 Tanima Sen as Bonolata Dostidaar – Niloy and Proloy's mother; Aradhya, Chiku, Poulomi and Leo's grandmother. (2021)
 Rii Sen as Kaushambhi Dostidaar – Proloy's wife; Poulomi and Leo's mother. (2021)
 Ashmita Chakraborty as Poulomi Dostidaar – Proloy and Kaushambhi's daughter; Leo's sister; Aradhya and Chiku's cousin. (2021)
 Vicky Nandy as Diesel – A mechanic; Arjun's friend and assistant.(2021)
 Debdut Ghosh as Biplab Roy – Uttam's brother; Sunanda's husband; Labanya, Kaustab and Arjun's father; Gogol's grandfather. (2021)
 Jayati Chakraborty as Sunanda Roy – Biplab's wife; Labanya, Kaustab and Arjun's mother; Gogol's grandmother. (2021)
 Kheyali Ghosh Dostidar as Mrs. Roy – Biplab and Uttam's mother; Labanya, Kaustab, Arjun and Tupur's grandmother. (2021)
 Anindya Banerjee as Uttam Roy – Biplab's brother; Shampa's husband; Tupur's father. (2021)
 Ivana Dutta as Shampa Roy – Uttam's wife; Tupur's mother. (2021)
 Sreejita Biswas as Tupur Roy – Uttam and Shampa's daughter; Labanya, Kaustab and Arjun's cousin. (2021)
 Dwaipayan Das as Kaustab Roy – A bank manager; Biplab and Sunanda's elder son; Labanya and Arjun's brother; Aradhya's former lover; Nupur's husband; Gogol's father. (2021)
 Jagriti Goswami Ghatak as Nupur Roy – Jhinuk's sister; Kaustab's wife. (2021)
 Payel Dutta as Labanya Roy – Biplab and Sunanda's daughter; Kaustab and Arjun's sister. (2021)
 Rupsha Mondal / Samata Chatterjee Lahiri as Jhinuk – Nupur's sister. (2021)
Poonam Basak as Jhimli – Chiku's house maid.(2021)
Sayak Chakraborty as Gaur aka Garry – Chiku's ex-fiancée; Kaushambhi's nephew.(2021)
 Biswabasu Biswas as Yuvraj Mukherjee – Chiku's former friend.(2021)

Guest appearance
 Monami Ghosh as Iraboti/ Anushree (cameo appearance from Irabotir Chupkotha)
 Syed Arefin as Akash Chatterjee (cameo appearance from Irabotir Chupkotha)

 Gourav Ghosal as a competitor in Asian Food Competition
 Indrajeet Bose as himself, a celebrity to promote the poush-parbon mela
 Usha Uthup 
 Nachiketa Chakraborty
Rupankar Bagchi
Jojo

Reception

Ratings

Adaptations

References 

Bengali-language television programming in India
2019 Indian television series debuts
Indian drama television series
Star Jalsha original programming
2021 Indian television series endings